Nathaniel Gerard Smith (born 1980) is an Australian politician. He has been a member of the New South Wales Legislative Assembly since 2019, representing Wollondilly for the Liberal Party where he lives with his wife and sends his children to school. 

Smith, the son of former NSW Attorney General Greg Smith, trained as a plumber and has completed a master's degree in Organisational Communications. Since joining Parliament, he has overseen the Bowral and District Hospital Redevelopment and the complete upgrade of Picton High School.  He has fought for households affected by mining subsidence and has advocated for the rejuvenation of the Picton to Colo Vale loop line, agri-tourism and the protection of local character.  He is passionate about improving local roads and supporting young apprentices and families.

References

 

1980 births
Living people
Liberal Party of Australia members of the Parliament of New South Wales
Members of the New South Wales Legislative Assembly
21st-century Australian politicians